Mirza Jabbar Asgarzadeh famously known as Jabbar Baghcheban was an Iranian inventor. He is well known as someone who established the first Iranian kindergarten and the first deaf school in Tabriz. He was also the inventor of Persian language cued speech. He was the father of the late Iranian composer Samin Baghcheban. In total he had three children.

Biography 
Mirza Jabbar Asgarzadeh was born in Yerevan. His grandfather was from Tabriz or Urmia. That is why he was given the nickname  which literally means 'gardener' in the Persian language.

He founded a school for the deaf in 1924, located next to his kindergarten. In 1928 he wrote the first Iranian children's book in Persian. The book was called  which means 'snow father' in Persian.

References

Azerbaijani-language writers
Armenian Azerbaijanis
1886 births
1966 deaths
Armenian educators
Iranian educators
Language teachers
20th-century Iranian inventors
Azerbaijani inventors
Writers from Yerevan
People involved with sign language
People from Tabriz
Emigrants from the Russian Empire to Iran
Educators of the deaf